Veliko Polje is an urban settlement of the Croatian capital of Zagreb, within Novi Zagreb – istok District. The population is 1,668 (census 2011).

References

Populated places in the City of Zagreb